Blacks Harbour is a community in the incorporated rural community of Eastern Charlotte, New Brunswick, Canada. It held village status prior to 2023. It is on a harbour of the same name opening onto the Bay of Fundy. It is 15 kilometres southeast of the town of St. George, 3 kilometres west of Beaver Harbour and 56 kilometres east from the town of St. Stephen on Route 176.

History 
Blacks Harbour's exact origin is unknown, possibly an early family name.  Post office dates from 1889.

On 1 January 2023, Blacks Harbour amalgamated with St. George and all or part of five local service districts to form the new incorporated rural community of Eastern Charlotte. The name Blacks Harbour remains in official use.

Geography 
Blacks Harbour is the northern terminus for the year-round Blacks Harbour to Grand Manan Island Ferry operated by Coastal Transport

Fishing has been a vital part of its existence for over 200 years. Connors Brothers Limited was founded in 1885 at Blacks Harbour, now a major international processor of all types of seafood. The company is also a major New Brunswick employer.

Demographics 

Language

References

Communities in Charlotte County, New Brunswick
Former villages in New Brunswick
Populated coastal places in Canada